This is a timeline of deworming, and specifically mass deworming.

Big picture

Full timeline

See also
Helminthiasis
List of diseases eliminated from the United States
Neglected tropical diseases
Soil-transmitted helminthiasis
Timeline of cholera
Timeline of global health

References

Deworming
Global health